William Henry Reynolds (February 29, 1868 – October 13, 1931) was an American real estate builder and politician from New York.

Life 
Reynolds was born on February 29, 1868, in Brooklyn, New York, the son of William Reynolds and Margaret McChesney. His father worked as a builder and carpenter.

Reynolds studied law for two years at New York University, but didn't graduate. He initially worked for his father. When he was 18, he opened a real estate broker office and began buying, developing, and selling land in Bedford. He quickly became so successful, his father began working for him. In the early 1890s, he bought at least 80 lots in Prospect Heights previously meant for Prospect Park and turned them into row houses. He also built the Montauk Theatre, rebuilt the Bennett Casino, and helped create Borough Park. He also developed neighborhoods in Bensonhurst and Westminster Heights, built the Jamaica Racetrack, owned several movie theaters (including the Casino Theatre in Manhattan). He opened Dreamland, a Coney Island amusement park, in 1904. The park was destroyed in a terrible fire in 1911.

In 1893, Reynolds was elected to the New York State Senate as a Republican, representing New York's 3rd State Senate district. He served in the State Senate in 1894 and 1895. While in the State Senate, he voted against the consolidation of New York City and Brooklyn.

In 1907, Reynolds went to Long Beach, then a few ramshackle buildings on the sand dunes, and began developing it. In 1914, when Long Beach became a village, he was elected the first village president. In 1922, when it became a city, he was elected the first mayor. He also developed Lido Beach. He served as president of the Lido Realty Corporation, Long Beach on the Ocean, Inc., the Alert Associates, the Livingston Amusement Company, the Blythedale Water Company, the Reylex Corporation, and the Long Beach Railway Company. He was also director of the Long Island Safe Deposit Company.

In August 1917, Reynolds was indicted by a grand jury for committing perjury in 1912, when he served as an expert witness in the condemnation proceedings of Rockaway Park land. He claimed he had no personal interest or ownership in the property, when in fact he held at least 20% of Neponsit Realty Company, which sold the land to New York City for $1,225,000. In October, he was again indicted with three others for conspiring to defraud the City. The indictments were dismissed in 1920.

In May 1924, while serving as mayor of Long Beach, Reynolds was indicted with Long Beach treasurer John Gracy for stealing over $8,000 from the city funds. They were tried and found guilty in June for committing grand larceny and Reynolds was removed from his mayoral office. They were sentenced to six months in the Nassau County jail, but they were permitted to remain free pending their appeal. In June 1925, the appellate court reversed the earlier ruling and ordered a new trial be conducted. The charges were dropped in 1927.

Reynolds was married to Elsie Guerrier. They had two daughters, Mrs. Charles C. Warren and Mrs. Russel O. Ellis. He was a member of the Freemasons and the Elks.

Reynolds died at home of heart disease on October 13, 1931. He was buried in Green-Wood Cemetery.

References

External links 
 The Political Graveyard

1868 births
1931 deaths
Politicians from Brooklyn
American real estate brokers
19th-century American politicians
20th-century American politicians
Republican Party New York (state) state senators
People from Long Beach, New York
Politicians from Nassau County, New York
Mayors of places in New York (state)
New York (state) politicians convicted of crimes
American Freemasons
Burials at Green-Wood Cemetery